Admiral Kornilov was a protected cruiser of the Russian Imperial Navy. She was presumably named for Admiral Vladimir Alexeyevich Kornilov.

The ship was laid down in 1886 and launched in 1887 at St. Nazaire in France. She was commissioned in 1888. She displaced . The armament consisted of ten /40?(35) guns, six 3-pounders (47 mm) and ten 1-pounders (37 mm) plus six  torpedo tubes. During a refit in 1904/05 the main armament was changed to ten  guns. She had two shafts and a bunker capacity of 1,000 tons of coal. The crew numbered 479 men.

Admiral Kornilov was unique to the Russian Navy but resembled the large protected cruisers Tage and Amiral Cécille built at the same time for the French Navy. These were unusually long cruisers at the time, although surpassed in 1892 by the British .

The ship was used as a torpedo training ship from 1908 and was stricken from the active list in 1911.

Bibliography

External links

 http://web.ukonline.co.uk/aj.cashmore/russia/cruisers/admiralkornilov/admiralkornilov.html
 http://www.neva.ru./EXPO96/arm/adk.html

Naval ships of Russia
1887 ships
Cruisers of the Imperial Russian Navy